Philippicus was Byzantine emperor from 711 to 713. He took power in a coup against the unpopular emperor Justinian II, and was deposed in a similarly violent manner nineteen months later. During his brief reign, Philippicus supported monothelitism in Byzantine theological disputes, and saw conflict with the First Bulgarian Empire and the Umayyad Caliphate.

Biography
Philippicus was originally named Bardanes; he was the son of the patrician Nicephorus, who was of Armenian extraction from an Armenian colony in Pergamum. The Armenian background of Philippicus has been supported by Byzantinist historians Peter Charanis and Nicholas Adontz, and disputed by Anthony Kaldellis. Kaldellis adds that Bardanes was probably born and raised in the Byzantine realm, as his father Nicephorus possibly was. Contemporaneous sources attest to Bardanes' tutoring, scholarly interests, learning and eloquence, all of which were in Greek. Byzantine historians Leslie Brubaker and John Haldon suggested Bardanes had some connection or affiliation with the Armenian Mamikonian family, which Kaldellis also denies. Byzantine researcher Toby Bromige felt Kaldellis was too dismissive of the Armenian ancestry of certain Byzantine individuals.

Relying on the support of the Monothelite party, he made some pretensions to the throne on the outbreak of the first great rebellion against Emperor Justinian II; these led to his relegation to Cephalonia by Tiberius III, and subsequently to his banishment to Cherson by order of Justinian. Here, Bardanes, taking the name Philippicus, successfully incited the inhabitants to revolt with the help of the Khazars. The successful rebels seized Constantinople, and Justinian fled; Philippicus took the throne. Justinian was subsequently seized and beheaded; his son Tiberius was likewise apprehended by Philippicus's officers, Ioannes and Mauros, and killed in a church. Justinian's principal officers, such as Barasbakourios, were also massacred.

Reign
Among the first acts of Philippicus were the deposition of Cyrus (the orthodox patriarch of Constantinople) in favour of John VI (a member of his own sect), and the summoning of a conciliabulum of Eastern bishops, which abolished the canons of the Sixth Ecumenical Council. In response, the Roman Church refused to recognize the new emperor and his patriarch. Meanwhile, the Bulgarian ruler Tervel plundered up to the walls of Constantinople in 712. When Philippicus transferred an army from the Opsikion theme to police the Balkans, the Umayyad Caliphate under Al-Walid I made inroads across the weakened defenses of Asia Minor.

In late May 713 the Opsikion troops rebelled in Thrace. Several of their officers penetrated the city and blinded Philippicus on June 3, 713 while he was in the hippodrome. He was succeeded for a short while by his principal secretary, Artemius, who was raised to the purple as Emperor Anastasius II. He died in the same year.

See also

List of Byzantine emperors

Notes

Bibliography

References

Sources

Further reading
The Oxford Dictionary of Byzantium, Oxford University Press, 1991.

External links 

7th-century births
713 deaths
710s in the Byzantine Empire
8th-century Byzantine emperors
Armenian Byzantine emperors
Medieval Crimea
Twenty Years' Anarchy